Bejois may refer to two Indian products:

 Bejois (brandy), a make of Brandy manufactured by Amrut Distilleries
 Bejois (drink), a mango drink brand